Litobrancha is a genus of common burrower mayflies in the family Ephemeridae. There is at least one described species in Litobrancha, L. recurvata.

References

Further reading

 

Mayfly genera